Mitta Miraasu is a 2001 Tamil-language film directed by Kalanjiyam. The film stars Prabhu and Roja, while Napoleon, Alex, and Vadivelu play supporting roles. The music was composed by Aslam Mustafa, and the film released on 18 October 2001.

Plot
Chellaiya has two missions in life. The first is to remove the taint on the family name and expose the man behind his family's misfortunes. The second is to make his younger sibling a lawyer so that it will help him in achieving the first mission. The villain of the piece is Chellaiya's uncle Masilamani, who had turned the villagers against Chellaiya's father Singaperumal. Humiliated by the same people who had revered him once, Singaperumal dies of shock soon after (a laborious death scene). A few decades have passed since the incident, but Chellaiya seems nowhere near to fulfilling his mission, nor has Masilamani given up his wicked ways. In fact, Masilamani is stronger now, what with his two sons grown up and matching their father step-to-step in his villainy. The trio has no redeeming qualities. Many clichéd scenes later, Chellaiya fulfills his mission and redeems his family's reputation.

Cast
Prabhu as Chellaiya
Roja as Meenakshi
Alex as Masilamani
Napoleon as Singaperumal
Mumtaj as Vijaya
Vadivelu as Rangasamy
Kovai Sarala as Bhagyam
Manivannan
Ashwini
Ravi Rahul
Satya Prakash
 Sunder
 Chaplin Balu
 Sakthi

Production
Prabhu and Napoleon team together in 'Mitta Mirasu'. Playing the female leads are Roja and Mumtaj. The film is produced by C. R. Karunanidhi, N. Rajendran and M. Kalanjiyam. Kalanjiyam, who earlier directed films like Poomani', Poonthottam, Kizhakkum Merkkum, and Nilave Mugam Kaattu'', has written the story, screenplay, and dialogues apart from directing the film.

Shooting is on at locations in Ooty, Gobichettypalayam, and Pollachi. The film has art design by Uma Shanker, dance choreography by Lalitha Mani, stunt arrangements by Super Subbarayan, and editing by B. Lenin and V. T. Vijayan. Vairamuthu has done the lyrics, which are tuned by new music director Aslam Mustafa. Mustafa has earlier sung some songs for A. R. Rahman and earned appreciation for his songs in 'Malli'.

Meena had earlier refused to work in the film, feeling that the role of playing a mother onscreen would hurt further opportunities for her.

Soundtrack
The soundtrack was composed by Aslam Mustafa, with lyrics written by Vairamuthu
"Jal Jal" - Shankar Mahadevan
"Mittamirasu" - Mano
"Adiye" - K. S. Chithra
"Kichu Kichu" - Srinivas, Jaya
"Vannakiliye" - Srinivas, Sujatha Mohan

Awards
Tamil Nadu State Award for Best Villain - Alex

Critical reception
One critic wrote: "It is the same old storyline, same old incidents, practically the same old stars and the same old performances. The director tries to whip up excitement towards the end with some violent, bloody action scenes, but then it is a bit too late", while another critic wrote:"Mitta Miraasu sets several things up and raises expectations but then fails to deliver on those expectations. Problems arise and issues are created, but all of them end in a rather lame manner".

References

2001 films
2000s Tamil-language films
Films directed by Kalanjiyam